Shimozawa is a Japanese surname. Notable people with the surname include:

Kan Shimozawa (1892–1968), Japanese novelist
Saki Shimozawa, a Japanese women's silver medal winner in Ice hockey at the 2011 Asian Winter Games
Yuta Shimozawa (born 1997), Japanese footballer

Japanese-language surnames